is a Japanese social network game developed and published by Square Enix.

Plot
The newly established private high school for girls, Goryoukan Academy, has a hidden face that people on the outside don't know about. The world you know is under threat by aliens, named "Oburi" (apparitions). These enemies are too strong for normal humans, and are especially threatening due to the fact that they can travel through to the 'fourth' dimension where they can be safe. For some reason, certain young girls are able to harness the power to transverse these dimensions, and enter a 'fifth' dimension - a parallel universe.

The only ones capable of fighting this enemy of mankind are girls known as "Strikers", who have the ability to sense the fifth dimension. Goryoukan Academy is actually an organization that seeks out girls who are more than meets the eye and trains them up for the "Fifth Force", a combat force created to subjugate the Oburi.

There are endless amounts of parallel universes, all of which are similar but run in their own way. The Strikers are able to fight the Oburi by searching these alternate worlds for alternative "memory cards" (Memoca) costumes that are usable by them and effective against the "Oburi".

You have been chosen by a mysterious person to lead a group of 5 girls in defeating an enemy that is threatening to destroy the world. Why you were chosen and who you are yourself is a mystery...

Characters
Fifth Force

2ndTeam - Coconut Vega 

 Hazuki Shiranui (Leader) 

 Mari Yukishiro  

 Imina Ibuki

 Ryoko Shinonome 

 Ako Takamine

3rd Team - Procyon Pudding 

 Amane Kyoubashi (Leader) 

 Sasa Momokawa 

 Haruka Kurimoto 

 Rinoda Mano  

 Itsumi Natsume

4th Team - Biscuit Sirius 

 Niho Hinomiya (Leader) 

 Isari Haishima
 Kagari Haishima 

 Yukie Aoi

 Kaede Yamabuki

5th Team - Almond Fomalhaut 

 Charlotte Weiss (Leader)

 Tatiana Alexandrovna Krovskaya

 Faye Lee

 Monica Blueash

 Noel-Jaune Beart

6th Team - Altair Torte 

 Tsubame Miyama (Leader)

 Satoka Sumihara

 Io Yaginuma

 Yumi Sajima 

 Mana Namori

7th Team - Schokolad Mira 

 Aoi Uraba (Leader) 

 Chitose Yui/Yui Chitose

 Hotaru Sakamiya/Sakamiya Hotaru

 Shiori Kannagi/Kannagi Shiori

 Chika Wakatsuki/Wakatsuki Chika

Others 
 Sachiko Tanaka

 Akara Origami

 Hina Origami

 Koori Origami

 Morgana

 Koharu Minato

 Midori Hayakasaka

 Tierra Sensei

NPCs
 Moshune - モシュネ

 Hana-chan - ハナちゃん

Gameplay
Schoolgirl Strikers is a card collecting mobile game with RPG and visual novel influences. It was released in 2014 and is available for iOS and Android devices. Some of the things that make Schoolgirl Strikers different from your average card collecting game are the special story missions and the 3D battle system; along with the ability to dress the girls up as you see fit. The way the battle system as a whole works is also quite different; you can choose any girls you want (limited to 5 at a time) to be in your team as long as you have at least one card of them. Then you add main and sub "Memocas" to them instead of just simply putting the cards themselves in a battle deck. The main Memocas also affect the girls' appearances in battle.

Media

Anime
An original anime television adaption has been announced, Hiroshi Nishikiori directed the series at J.C.Staff with scripts written by Takao Yoshioka and Mizuto Suzuki and Kengo Tokusashi produced the music at Square Enix. The anime aired between January 7 to April 1, 2017, on Tokyo MX with further broadcasting on BS11, AT-X, KBS, and Sun TV; Crunchyroll streamed the anime. The designs for their combat outfits as key visual were unveiled in November 2016. The series ran for 13 episodes and released across seven BD/DVD volumes.

Episode list

Schoolgirl Strikers: Twinkle Melodies
 is a spin-off game also released for iPhone and Android devices. Set in the same universe as the original game, Twinkle Melodies is a rhythm game focused on a new team named Apricot Regulus, who want to be a Japanese idol group due to their abilities for singing. Characters from the original Schoolgirl Strikers appears in Twinkle Melodies, with the exception of Chocolate Mira and Almond Fomalhaut groups as the Others as well. The game features an anime opening and a new character design.

Notes

References

External links
  
  
 

2017 anime television series debuts
2014 video games
Anime television series based on video games
Action-adventure games
Action video games
Android (operating system) games
Crunchyroll anime
Fantasy video games
Fiction about monsters
Gacha games
High school-themed video games
IOS games
Japan-exclusive video games
J.C.Staff
Magical girl anime and manga
Mass media franchises
Multiplayer video games
Parkour video games
Role-playing video games
School life in anime and manga
Science fantasy video games
Science fiction video games
Spy video games
Superhero video games
Square Enix franchises
Square Enix games
Taito games
Tokyo MX original programming
Video games about magic
Video games featuring female protagonists
Video games about parallel universes
Video game franchises
Video game franchises introduced in 2014
Video games set in Asia
Video games set in Europe
Video games set in Japan
Video games set in London
Video games set in Tokyo
Video games set in the United Kingdom
Visual novels
War video games set in Asia
Works based on Square Enix video games
Video games developed in Japan